The 1921 All-Pacific Coast football team consists of American football players chosen by various organizations for All-Pacific Coast teams for the 1921 college football season.

All-Pacific Coast selections

Quarterback
 Charles F. Erb, California (UP-1) (unanimous pick by UP selectors)

Halfbacks
 Charles F. Dean, USC (UP-1)
 Crip Toomey, California (UP-1)

Fullback
 Archie Nisbet, California (UP-1)

Ends
 Robert A. Berkey, California (UP-1)
 Howard Stephens, California (UP-1) (unanimous pick by UP selectors)

Tackles
 Earl Leslie, Oregon (UP-1)
 Dan McMillan, California (UP-1)

Guards
 Webster V. Clark, California (UP-1)
 Lee D. Cranmer, California (UP-1)

Centers
 Earl Dunlap, Washington State (UP-1)

Key
UP = United Press, by the sporting editors of the leading Pacific coast newspapers, including the Oakland Tribune, Portland Journal, Seattle Star, Los Angeles Herald, Sacramento Star, San Francisco News, and Portland News

See also
1921 College Football All-America Team

References

All-Pacific Coast Football Team
All-Pacific Coast football teams
All-Pac-12 Conference football teams